Ghassan Achkar (born 8 October 1937) was a Lebanese politician and member of the Syrian Social Nationalist Party in Lebanon.

References

Syrian Social Nationalist Party in Lebanon politicians
1937 births
Lebanese Maronites
People from Matn District
2022 deaths